Built by BAE Systems, the Transparent Armor Gun shield, or TAGS, is a visually transparent protective gun shield for operators of vehicle-mounted machine guns.  It borrows on the experience of the Israeli Defense Force in using such armor on a variety of vehicles. The shield is intended to provide protection for its user while maintaining visibility.  It can be mounted on several models of armoured fighting vehicles (AFVs), including the M113, M1 Abrams and Stryker, as well as on the HMMWV.

References

External links
 BAE Systems press release

Vehicle armour

Armoured fighting vehicle equipment